ProCoder is a  video-encoding and transcoding software initially developed by the Canopus Corporation, now  Thomson SA.

Canopus ProCoder 1.2 was released in 2002, Canopus ProCoder 1.5 in 2003 and Canopus ProCoder 2 in 2004. In 2005 Thomson Multimedia acquired Canopus in order to bolster their Grass Valley broadcasting and network market.  ProCoder is offered as a part of Thomson Grass Valley video products under the name Grass Valley ProCoder. Grass Valley ProCoder 3.0 was released in 2007.

See also
List of video editing software

References

External links
 ProCoder 3 web page 

Video conversion software